Vĩnh An may refer to several places in Vietnam:

 Vĩnh An, Đồng Nai, a township and capital of Vĩnh Cửu District
 , a rural commune of Vĩnh Bảo District
 Vĩnh An, An Giang, a rural commune of Châu Thành District
 Vĩnh An, Bắc Giang, a rural commune of Sơn Động District
 , a rural commune of Ba Tri District
 , a rural commune of Tây Sơn District
 , a rural commune of Vĩnh Lộc District